Foul Bay is a bay in Egypt.

Foul Bay may also refer to:

Foul Bay, Barbados, a bay
 Foul Bay, Falkland Islands, a bay
 Foul Bay, South Australia, a locality